Ralf Brudel (born 6 February 1963 in Potsdam) is a retired German rower who won a gold medal in 1988 Summer Olympics in Seoul. He was a member of the East Germany national team. In 1990 he tried to settle in Austria, but after the reunification of Germany he came back to Potsdam where he qualified for the 1992 Summer Olympics of Barcelona.

References

1963 births
Living people
Sportspeople from Potsdam
People from Bezirk Potsdam
German male rowers
East German male rowers
Olympic rowers of East Germany
Olympic rowers of Germany
Rowers at the 1988 Summer Olympics
Rowers at the 1992 Summer Olympics
Olympic gold medalists for East Germany
Olympic silver medalists for Germany
Olympic medalists in rowing
Medalists at the 1992 Summer Olympics
Medalists at the 1988 Summer Olympics
World Rowing Championships medalists for East Germany
Recipients of the Patriotic Order of Merit in gold
Recipients of the Silver Laurel Leaf